Jakeb Nolan Burt (born August 25, 1996) is a professional Canadian football tight end for the Hamilton Tiger-Cats of the Canadian Football League (CFL). He was drafted first overall in the 2021 CFL Draft by the Tiger-Cats. He played college football for the Boston College Eagles from 2015 to 2019.

Professional career

New England Patriots
Burt was not selected in the 2020 NFL Draft, but he signed as an undrafted free agent with the New England Patriots of the National Football League to a three-year contract. He spent the entire season on the practice squad and was not re-signed for the following year.

Hamilton Tiger-Cats
Burt was a late addition to be qualified for the CFL Draft in 2021 after he provided documentation proving his National status. His draft value rapidly rose to the point that he was selected with the first overall pick in the 2021 CFL Draft by the Hamilton Tiger-Cats. He signed his rookie contract on the same day of the draft which was registered with the league on May 5, 2021. However, he spent the entire 2021 season on the injured list.

Burt made his professional debut in the season opening game of 2022 on June 11, against the Saskatchewan Roughriders in his city of birth, Regina. In that game, he recorded two receptions for ten yards.

Personal life
Burt was born in Regina, Saskatchewan, to parents Scott and Dawn Burt. Burt and his family moved to Lynnfield, Massachusetts, when he was four years old and he grew up in the Boston area.

References

External links
 Hamilton Tiger-Cats bio
 Boston College bio

1996 births
Living people
Boston College Eagles football players
Canadian football tight ends
Hamilton Tiger-Cats players
New England Patriots players
People from Lynnfield, Massachusetts
Players of American football from Massachusetts
Players of Canadian football from Saskatchewan
Sportspeople from Regina, Saskatchewan